China Can Say No is a 1996 Chinese language non-fiction manifesto written and edited by Song Qiang, Zhang Zangzang (whose original name is Zhang Xiaobo), Qiao Bian, Tang Zhengyu, and Gu Qingsheng. It was published in China and strongly expresses Chinese nationalism. Its full title is often translated as The China That Can Say No: Political and Emotional Choices in the post Cold-War era. It became an overnight bestseller, as the authors called on the Beijing government to stand up against the United States in a new era of global competition. In addition the book bashes Japan for defection from Asia in favor of an American connection. The popularity indicates the growth of anti-American and anti-Japanese sentiment in the Chinese public. It indicates disillusionment among many younger and better educated Chinese as the nation searches for a major role in the global economic and political systems.  The Beijing government originally endorsed the general thesis, but after sharp criticism from the United States and Asia, the government condemned the book as an irresponsible source of confusion, and banned it from circulation.

Authors
Zhang Zangzang, one of the authors of China Can Say No, is a former student radical and "uncritical admirer of all things American". His disillusionment with foreign countries' treatment of China, and particularly that by America, reflects the experience of about a quarter of Chinese students studying in the United States, who, despite their initial Americophilia, undergo a surge of Chinese patriotism upon their return. Contributing factors to this transformation in the United States include racial discrimination, denial of cultural legitimacy, and negative media portrayal.

Contents
The book, which is modeled on The Japan That Can Say No, argues that many "fourth-generation" Chinese embraced Western values too strongly in the 1980s and disregarded their heritage and background. All of the authors were strong critics of Chinese government and Deng Xiaoping's neoliberal reforms, and at least two of the authors participated in the Tiananmen Square protests of 1989. Another author was sentenced to seven years in jail by the Chinese government in the 1980s for his pro-democracy activities, though he was released after only serving three years.  The book specifically criticizes a number of activists such as physicist Fang Lizhi and journalist Liu Binyan.

Describing a disenchantment among Chinese with the US starting in the 1990s, especially after it adopted a China containment policy, rejected China's bid for the World Trade Organization, and worked against China's bid for the 2000 Summer Olympics, the authors criticize US foreign policy (in particular, support for Taiwan) and American individualism. The book deplores unfair treatment of China by the US (as symbolized by the Yinhe Incident of 1993). It claims that China is used as a scapegoat for American problems and voices support for such governments as that of Fidel Castro's Cuba which openly declare their opposition to the US. The book also focuses on Japan. It accuses Japan of being a client state of the US, argues that Japan should not get a seat on the United Nations Security Council, and supports a renewed call for war reparations to China from Japan for its actions in the Second Sino-Japanese War.

A Japanese translation by Mo Bangfu and Suzuki Kaori was published in 1996 by Nikkei. No English translation has been published.

Sequel
In 2009, Unhappy China, a follow-up version, was published.

References

1996 non-fiction books
Chinese-language books
Chinese nationalism
Criticism of the United States